Sidney Joseph Furie (born February 28, 1933) is a Canadian film director, screenwriter, and producer best known for his extensive work in both British and American cinema between the 1960s and early 1980s. Like his contemporaries Norman Jewison and Ted Kotcheff, he was one of the earliest Canadian directors to achieve mainstream critical and financial success outside their native country at a time when its film industry was virtually nonexistent. He won a BAFTA Film Award and was nominated for a Palme d'Or for his work on the acclaimed spy thriller The Ipcress File (1965) starring Michael Caine.

He is considered by some an auteur director, elevating otherwise unremarkable genre films through strong, creative visuals, and atmospheric direction. His horror film The Entity (1982) was declared by director Martin Scorsese as one of the scariest movies of all time, and his Vietnam War film The Boys in Company C (1978) was a major influence on Stanley Kubrick's Full Metal Jacket (1987). He is also the co-creator of the Iron Eagle action film franchise which began in 1986, and directed three of its four entries.

Early life
Furie was born as Sholom Joseph Furie to a Jewish family in Toronto, Ontario, Canada in 1933. He attended Vaughan Road Collegiate and Carnegie Mellon University in Pittsburgh, Pennsylvania.

Career
Furie worked as a writer for the Canadian Broadcasting Corporation, where, in 1957, he wrote and directed a feature-length drama, A Dangerous Age. A dark variation on the Romeo and Juliet story, it starred Ben Piazza and Anne Pearson as teenage lovers on the run from the authorities, unable to legally elope and get married. A cash-in on then trend of "juvenile delinquent" films, it was nonetheless something of a landmark in Canadian cinema, one of the first times the country had seriously marketed a film overseas. Despite the support of popular producer and distributor Nat Taylor, it failed to find a following in its native country, but was critically acclaimed by British critics, who saw the young Furie as a fresh talent.

A year later, Furie again tried his hand at gritty adolescent drama, writing and directing A Cool Sound from Hell. Shot on location in Toronto, the film followed a young, jazz-obsessed hipster wandering aimlessly through the city's streets and metro stations, who finds himself plunged into the world of illicit drug smuggling while pursuing a femme fatale. A direct refutation of his home town's squeaky-clean self-image, the film suffered the same fate as his previous one, failing to find a proper distributor and falling into obscurity. The film was long thought lost, until it was rediscovered decades later by Furie's biographer Daniel Kremer in the vaults of the British Film Institute, mislabelled as The Beat Generation. The restored film premiered at the Toronto International Film Festival in September 2016.

Unable to find success or recognition in his native country, Furie relocated to England, where he had received critical acclaim, in hopes of pursuing more successful ventures. He dabbled in various genres, including horror (Doctor Blood's Coffin), comedy (Three on a Spree), and musicals (The Young Ones). His brief dip into the kitchen sink realism movement produced The Leather Boys, which in addition to showcasing the period's rocker subculture, is considered groundbreaking due to its latent homosexual themes. It has since become recognized as a key entry in the queer cinema subgenre. His major breakthrough came in 1964 when he directed the spy film The Ipcress File. Intended as a direct response to the popularity of the James Bond franchise, the film showcased a darker, and more downbeat portrayal of espionage. Its lead character Harry Palmer (played by Michael Caine) has become iconic, and the film was widely acclaimed, winning a BAFTA Award for Best British Film, an Edgar Award for Best Screenplay, and was nominated for a Palme d'Or at the prestigious Cannes Film Festival. The film showcased Furie's unique visual style, utilizing multiple cameras, long-take master shots, and dynamic camera movement in lieu of fast cutting. Furie worked closely with director of photography Otto Heller to shoot through and around foreground objects, creating a "refracted" view of the action and an all-encompassing sense of paranoia. The film proved very successful, and spawned five sequels.

Furie relocated again, this time to Hollywood, where he began his American directing career with The Appaloosa, a Western film starring Marlon Brando and John Saxon. He revisited the spy genre with a follow-up to The Ipcress File; The Naked Runner. Both films feature Furie's signature visuals and directorial style. In 1972, he directed Lady Sings the Blues, a biographical drama about the life of jazz singer-songwriter Billie Holiday, for which lead actress Diana Ross was nominated for an Academy Award for Best Actress. Furie was later attached to direct the similarly-themed remake of The Jazz Singer, but was replaced by Richard Fleischer halfway through principal photography. He was originally offered to direct The Godfather by producer Albert S. Ruddy, but he left the job early in pre-production due to budget disputes, being replaced by Francis Ford Coppola due to the producers' desire to keep the film "ethnic to the core". The film would go on to become a massive critical and financial success, winning the Best Picture Oscar and spawning two sequels. Furie's 1981 horror movie The Entity was declared by Martin Scorsese to be one of the "scariest movies of all time".

Furie wrote and directed the 1986 action war film Iron Eagle, adapting a screenplay by writer Kevin Alyn Elders based on the real-life 1981 Gulf of Sidra incident. The film was overshadowed by the release of the similarly themed Top Gun later that year, but proved successful enough on home video to warrant three sequels, two of which Furie directed. His 1987 superhero film Superman IV: The Quest for Peace was marred by last-minute budget cuts, forcing Furie to resort to cost-cutting tactics that included relocating the production from New York City to Milton Keynes; scaling-down or outright cutting planned set-pieces; and using cheaper, sub-standard visual effects. The film also suffered from numerous re-edits in post-production, with multiple sub-plots, characters, and a total of 45 minutes of footage being cut. The film was a critical and commercial failure.

Since 1991, Furie has mostly directed direct-to-video action and genre films. He has also directed television series like Pensacola: Wings of Gold, Lonesome Dove: The Series, and V.I.P. He and his early film A Cool Sound from Hell were given retrospectives at the 2016 Toronto International Film Festival, and in 2010 he received a Lifetime Achievement Award from the Directors Guild of Canada.

Filmography 

 A Dangerous Age (1958)
 A Cool Sound from Hell (1959)
 Dr. Blood's Coffin (1961)
 The Snake Woman (1961)
 During One Night (1961)
 The Young Ones (1961)
 Three on a Spree (1961)
 The Boys (1962)
 Wonderful Life (1964)
 The Leather Boys (1964)
 The Ipcress File (1965)
 The Appaloosa (1966)
 The Naked Runner (1967)
 The Lawyer (1970)
 Little Fauss and Big Halsy (1970)
 Lady Sings the Blues (1972)
 Hit! (1973)
 Sheila Levine Is Dead and Living in New York (1975)
 Gable and Lombard (1976)
 The Boys in Company C (1977), also writer
 The Jazz Singer (1980), uncredited
 The Entity (1982)
 Purple Hearts (1984)
 Iron Eagle (1986), also writer
 Superman IV: The Quest for Peace (1987)
 Iron Eagle II (1988), also writer
 The Taking of Beverly Hills (1991), also writer
 Ladybugs (1992)
 Iron Eagle on the Attack (1995)
 Hollow Point (1996)
 Top of the World (1997)
 The Rage (1997)
 In Her Defense (1999)
 My 5 Wives (2000)
 Cord (2000)
 Road Rage (2000) (TV film)
 Under Heavy Fire (2001) (TV film)
 Partners in Action (2002)
 The Fraternity (2002)
 Global Heresy (2002)
 Detention (2003)
 Direct Action (2004), also writer
 American Soldiers (2005)
 The Veteran (2006), (TV film)
 The Four Horsemen (2008), direct to DVD
 Conduct Unbecoming (2011)
 The Dependables (2014)

Awards and nominations 
 1965 Nominated for Palme d'Or at the 1965 Cannes Film Festival for Best Film of 1965 for The IPCRESS File.
 1966 Won BAFTA for Best British Film in Colour of 1965 for The IPCRESS File.
 1980 Nominated Razzie Award for Worst Director with Richard Fleischer for The Jazz Singer.
 2006 Lady Sings the Blues, starring Diana Ross as jazz legend Billie Holiday and directed by Furie in 1972 inducted into the Black Movie Awards Classic Cinema Hall of Fame.
 2010 Directors Guild of Canada Lifetime Achievement Award.
 2016 - The Toronto International Film Festival honoured Furie with a screening of his early film A Cool Sound from Hell.

See also
 Cinema of Canada
 List of Canadian directors

References

External links
 
 Complete filmography at New York Times

1933 births
Living people
Action film directors
Canadian expatriate film directors in the United States
Film producers from Ontario
Canadian male screenwriters
Film directors from Toronto
Jewish Canadian filmmakers
Jewish Canadian writers
Writers from Toronto
20th-century Canadian screenwriters
20th-century Canadian male writers